Gonzales v. United States, 348 U.S. 407 (1955), was a case in which the Supreme Court of the United States held that a Jehovah's Witness was denied fair hearing because of failure to supply him with materials in his record.

Facts of the case
Gonzales, a member of Jehovah's Witnesses who had claimed and had been denied conscientious objector exemption, was convicted under the Universal Military Training and Service Act for refusal to submit to induction into the armed forces.

Decision of the court
The 6-3 opinion of the court was written by Justice Clark, holding that the petitioner was entitled to receive a copy of the recommendation made by the Department of Justice to the Appeal Board under the provisions of 6 (j) of the Universal Military Training and Service Act. Justice Reed, joined by Justice Burton, and Justice Minton each filed a dissenting opinion.

See also
List of United States Supreme Court cases, volume 348

References

External links
 

1955 in United States case law
United States Supreme Court cases
Jehovah's Witnesses litigation in the United States
United States Supreme Court cases of the Warren Court
1955 in religion
Christianity and law in the 20th century